The Cross of Solomon Islands (CSI) is the second class award of the Order of the Solomon Islands and is awarded for "most conspicuous and outstanding service". The limitations of this class are that at any one issue (i.e. yearly) only ten may be awarded. There may however only be fifty members of this award at any one time. Any person whether national or expatriate may be appointed to this class if they are distinguished persons. The Court of St James's has placed it immediately above the Knight/Dame Commander of the Most Excellent Order of the British Empire, and below the Knight/Dame Grand Cross of the Most Excellent Order of the British Empire.

The medal, designed by Patrick O'Callaghan, is two inches in overall size and made in silver gilt and enamels. The straight armed cross pattee in silver gilt has linking the four arms the crescent shape symbol of the paramount chiefs. Each such link contains a double headed frigate bird which is cast into the crescent shape. In the centre the shield only of the Solomon Islands Coat-of-Arms in full colour enamels sits on a green enamel background. This is surrounded by a royal blue enamel circular band with base metal (i.e. silver gilt) piping on both circumferences and contains the wording "SERVICE TO SOLOMON ISLANDS" in raised silver gilt lettering. At the top of the cross is a ring to which a loop, made of gilt, is attached. The medal is awarded with individual metal cases covered with blue rexine and lined with green velvet.

The design of the Cross originates from two sources. The first is from the honours and awards systems throughout the world which have used for many years the basic cross shape. The second is that the cross is the traditional symbol of Christianity, which has spread throughout Solomon Islands.

All the awards in the Order of Solomon Islands are of the "neck hanging" variety, and are not accompanied with lapel pins. The reason for this is rather simple. As the majority of the population of Solomon Islands live outside the capital city in rural areas, and in a hot and humid tropical climate, it is very acceptable for men to wear little if any clothing on the top half of their bodies. With nowhere to pin an award it seemed sensible to design the award as a neck hanger.

See also 

 Star of Solomon Islands
 Commonwealth realms orders and decorations

References 

Solomon Islands culture
Orders, decorations, and medals of the Solomon Islands
 
Awards established in 1981
1981 establishments in the Solomon Islands